Ahmad Salam Muhammad (born 20 August 1924) is a Pakistani former sports shooter. He competed in the 50 metre pistol event at the 1964 Summer Olympics.

References

External links
 

1924 births
Possibly living people
Pakistani male sport shooters
Olympic shooters of Pakistan
Shooters at the 1964 Summer Olympics
Place of birth missing (living people)